RAF Gambut  (or RAF Kambut) is a complex of six abandoned military airfields in Libya, located about  north-northeast of the village of Kambut, and  east-south-east of Tobruk.  During World War II, the complex was an important facility, used by the Royal Air Force and many RAF squadrons were temporarily based there.

History
Gambiut was an airfield of Regia Aeronautica.
Axis forces captured Gambut on 17 June 1941, after the Battle of Tobruk. This was a significant blow to the Allies as the airfield had been used to provide air-support to the Allied forces besieged at Tobruk. The airfield saw use by the German Luftwaffe until its recapture by the New Zealand 4th Infantry Brigade on 25 November.

Today the remains of the airfields – deteriorating under the desert sands – are visible on aerial photographs.

Airfields at Gambut
This station consisted of six airfields known as Gambut 1 (LG139), this being the main airfield, Gambut 2 (LG142), Gambut 3 (LG143), Gambut West/Gambut 4 (LG156), Gambut 5 (LG159) and Gambut 6 (LG158).

Major units assigned

 Commonwealth air forces (RAF except where stated.) 
Gambut Main (No.1)
Units
 Squadrons
 6, 11, 14, 33, 38, 45, 46, 47 55, 73, 80, 84 108, 112, 113, 145, 148, 162, 203, 208, 227, 229, 237, 238, 250, 252, 274, 294, 450 (RAAF), 454 (RAAF)
 HQ, 239 Wing  (1 Mar – 17 Jun 1942, 14–15 Nov 1942)
 HQ, 243 Wing  (May – 20 Jun 1942)
 HQ, 233 Wing (14–18 Nov 1942)
 HO, 223 Wing (SAAF)
Gambut (No.2)
Units
 Squadrons
 73, 112, 250, 274, 450 (RAAF)
 HQ, 233 Wing (22 May – 28 Jun 1942)
Gambut (No.3)
Units
 Squadrons
 14, 73, 117, 250, 294, 454 (RAAF), 459 (RAAF), 603
 HQ, 235 Wing (3 Dec 1942 – 29 Feb 1944)
Gambut West
Units
 Squadrons
 73, 92, 145, 208, 213, 238, 601
 HQ, 285 Wing (14–20 Nov 1942)

 United States Army Air Forces 
 12th Bombardment Group (B-25 Mitchell)
 434th Bombardment Squadron 17 December 1942 – 16 February 1943
 93d Bombardment Group 16–25 February 1943 (B-24 Liberator)
 409th Bombardment Squadron 16 Dec 1942 – 25 February 1943
 376th Bombardment Group 10–25 February 1943 (B-24 Liberator)
 57th Fighter Group 13–20 November 1942 (P-40 Warhawk)

See also
 List of World War II North Africa Airfields

References
Citations

Bibliography

External links

 http://www.rafweb.org/Stations/Stations-G.htm
 German map of Gambut

Airfields of the United States Army Air Forces in Libya
Royal Air Force stations of World War II in Africa
Defunct airports
World War II airfields in Libya